André Luiz Tavares (born 30 July 1983), commonly known as Andrezinho or even Tavares in South Korea, is a Brazilian former professional footballer. Mainly an attacking midfielder, he was also capable to play in other midfield positions, as a wide midfielder or central midfielder. He also has four caps with the Brazil U-23 and has one goal.

Honours

Clubs
Flamengo
 Campeonato Carioca: 2001
 Copa dos Campeões: 2001

Pohang Steelers
 K-League: 2007

Internacional
 Campeonato Gaúcho: 2008, 2009, 2011
 Copa Sudamericana: 2008
 Suruga Bank Championship: 2009
 Copa Libertadores: 2010
 Recopa Sudamericana: 2011

Botafogo
 Campeonato Carioca: 2013

Vasco da Gama
 Campeonato Carioca: 2016

National Team
Brazil
 FIFA U-17 World Cup: 1999
 FIFA U-20 World Cup: 2003

Individual
 Korean League Cup Top Assists Award: 2004
 K League Most Valuable Player: 2007
 Campeonato Carioca Team of the year: 2016

References

External links
 
 
 
 

1983 births
Sportspeople from Campinas
Living people
Association football midfielders
Brazilian footballers
Brazilian expatriate footballers
Brazil under-20 international footballers
CR Flamengo footballers
Pohang Steelers players
Nova Iguaçu Futebol Clube players
Sport Club Internacional players
Botafogo de Futebol e Regatas players
Tianjin Jinmen Tiger F.C. players
CR Vasco da Gama players
Campeonato Brasileiro Série A players
K League 1 Most Valuable Player Award winners
K League 1 players
Chinese Super League players
Expatriate footballers in China
Expatriate footballers in South Korea
Brazilian expatriate sportspeople in China
Brazilian expatriate sportspeople in South Korea